Théo Ndicka Matam (born 20 April 2000) is a French professional footballer who plays as a left-back for Oostende.

Professional career
Ndicka is a youth product of Lyon, and began his career with their reserve side before joining Bourg-en-Bresse on loan for the 2019–20 season. On 2 July 2020, Ndicka signed a professional contract with Oostende. Ndicka made his professional debut with Oostende in a 1–0 Belgian First Division A loss to Charleroi on 15 August 2020.

International career
Born in France, Ndicka is of Cameroonian descent. He is a youth international for France.

References

External links
 
 FFF Profile

2001 births
Living people
People from Avallon
French footballers
France under-21 international footballers
France youth international footballers
French sportspeople of Cameroonian descent
Olympique Lyonnais players
Football Bourg-en-Bresse Péronnas 01 players
K.V. Oostende players
Belgian Pro League players
Championnat National 2 players
Championnat National 3 players
Association football defenders
French expatriate footballers
French expatriate sportspeople in Belgium
Expatriate footballers in Belgium
Footballers from Bourgogne-Franche-Comté
Sportspeople from Yonne